

Anapsids

Newly named turtles

References